Sir Neville Marriner,  (15 April 1924 – 2 October 2016) was an English violinist and "one of the world's greatest conductors". Gramophone lists Marriner as one of the 50 greatest conductors and another compilation ranks Marriner #14 of the 18 "Greatest and Most Famous Conductors of All Time". He founded the Academy of St Martin in the Fields, and his partnership with them is the most recorded of any orchestra and conductor.

Early life
Marriner was born in Lincoln, England, the son of Herbert Marriner, a carpenter, and his wife Ethel (née Roberts). He was educated at Lincoln School (then a grammar school), where he played in a jazz band with the composer Steve Race. He initially learned the violin as well as the piano from his father, and later studied the violin with Frederick Mountney. 

In 1939, he went to the Royal College of Music in London, getting the opportunity to play among the second violins of the London Symphony Orchestra, then conducted by Henry Wood, because many of its members had joined up after the outbreak of the Second World War. He joined up himself in 1941, serving in a reconnaissance role in the British Army, but was invalided out in 1943 with kidney problems. He returned to the Royal College, where he continued his studies with the violinist Billy Reed. He then attended the Paris Conservatoire, where he studied with the violinist René Benedetti.

Career
Marriner was briefly a music teacher at Eton College. In 1948, he became a professor of the Royal College of Music. In 1948 or 1949, he took up the position of second violinist of the Martin String Quartet, continuing to play with the quartet for 13 years. He had met the harpsichordist Thurston Dart while recuperating from kidney damage during the war, and they formed a duo together, which expanded to the Virtuoso String Trio with Peter Gibbs. These were the precursors to Dart's Jacobean Ensemble, in which Marriner played from 1951. He played the violin in two London orchestras: the Philharmonia Orchestra in the early 1950s, and the London Symphony Orchestra (LSO) as principal second violin (1954–69). He also played with the chamber orchestras of Reginald Jacques and Boyd Neel, as well as the London Mozart Players.

In 1958, he founded the Academy of St Martin in the Fields; initially a twelve-member chamber ensemble, it soon expanded to a chamber orchestra, and attracted musicians of a high calibre including Dart, Iona Brown, Christopher Hogwood and Alan Loveday. Marriner recorded prolifically with the Academy. The first recordings in the early 1960s, with Marriner both conducting and playing lead violin, were successful, leading Pierre Monteux, then the LSO's conductor, to encourage Marriner to shift his focus to conducting. Marriner had studied the subject with Monteux at his school in Hancock, Maine, in the United States, from around 1950.

Marriner was the founder and first music director of the Los Angeles Chamber Orchestra, from 1969 to 1978. From 1979 to 1986, he was music director of the Minnesota Orchestra. He was principal conductor of the Stuttgart Radio Symphony Orchestra from 1986 to 1989. Except for 1974 to 1980 during which Iona Brown was the director, he remained the musical director of the Academy of St Martin in the Fields until 2011, when he was succeeded by Joshua Bell, continuing to hold the title of Life President until his death. He also conducted many other orchestras, including the New York Chamber Orchestra, Gulbenkian Orchestra, Israel Chamber Orchestra, Australian Chamber Orchestra and Vienna Philharmonic. He continued to conduct into his nineties, becoming the oldest conductor of a Proms concert in 2014, aged 90.

His obituary in The Telegraph praises the Academy of St Martin in the Fields' interpretations of baroque and classical music as "fresh, technically brilliant", and describes them as a "revelation". Marriner preferred modern instruments and effects, and his work came under criticism by Hogwood, among others, for not striving for an authentic sound. He later expanded the Academy's repertoire to include Romantic and early-modern music.

Marriner made over 600 recordings covering 2,000 different works – more than any conductor except Herbert von Karajan. He recorded for various labels, including Argo, L'Oiseau Lyre, Philips and EMI Classics. His recorded repertoire ranges from the baroque era to 20th-century British music, as well as opera. He supervised the Mozart selections for the soundtrack of the Oscar-winning 1984 film Amadeus; it became one of the most popular classical music recordings of all time, selling over 6.5 million copies.

Personal life and death
Marriner was married twice.  His first wife was cellist (and later, antiquarian bookseller) Diana Carbutt, whom he married in 1949. They had two children  - Susie, a writer and Andrew, a clarinettist who often worked with his father and who is now principal clarinet of the London Symphony Orchestra. The first marriage was dissolved. His second wife was Elizabeth Mary Sims, whom he married in 1957. 

He lived in London and in later life had a second home near Chardstock in Devon. Asked for an epitaph for his gravestone, he replied simply: "Follow the beat." Marriner died on 2 October 2016, at the age of 92.

Honours
Marriner was appointed a Commander of the Order of the British Empire (CBE) in 1979. He was created a Knight Bachelor in 1985. In the 2015 Queen's Birthday Honours, he was appointed a Member of the Order of the Companions of Honour (CH). He was appointed an officer of the French Ordre des Arts et des Lettres. His recordings of Mozart were honoured with two Gemeinde Awards from the Austrian Music Academy.

References

External links

 
 
 
Lincoln Christ's Hospital School
Neville Marriner at Yarlung Artists

1924 births
2016 deaths
20th-century British conductors (music)
20th-century English musicians
21st-century British conductors (music)
21st-century English musicians
English classical violinists
British male violinists
Male classical violinists
Bach conductors
English conductors (music)
British male conductors (music)
London Symphony Orchestra players
Alumni of the Royal College of Music
Conservatoire de Paris alumni
Members of the Order of the Companions of Honour
Knights Bachelor
Conductors (music) awarded knighthoods
Commanders of the Order of the British Empire
Officiers of the Ordre des Arts et des Lettres
Honorary Members of the Royal Academy of Music
Grammy Award winners
People from Lincoln, England
British Army personnel of World War II